Mūlabhadra (മൂലഭദ്ര) aka Mūlabhadri (:ml:മൂലഭദ്രി) was a secret method of communication  employed by the royal spies of the erstwhile Travancore Kingdom during the medieval period. The scheme was also colloquially referred to as Mūlapatra. It was essentially a cryptographic scheme involving a partial transposition of the letters of the Malayalam alphabet. The scheme had been extensively used by King Marthanda Varma (1706–1758) of Travancore Kingdom and his spies both for oral and written communication of messages. It was a fixed one-time unchangeable code in as much as it did not employ any key in its implementation in contrast to modern methods of substitution ciphers involving the utilisation of a key for generating a system of codes. Mūlabhadra is the only such  scheme known to have been used in governance in this part of India during this period.The only known speaker of the language currently is K. N. Mohan, Ettumanoor, Kottayam district, Kerala.

The scheme

The following tables give the transposition scheme used in the Mulabhadra code.

Vowels

Consonants

Chillus

Mnemonic
The users had developed a mnemonic to learn and remember this language. The mnemonic was very similar to Sanskrit slokas.

അകോഖഗോഘങശ്ചൈവ

ചടോഞണതപോമനഃ

യശോരഷോലസശ്ചൈവ

Examples

See also
 Mlecchita vikalpa

References

History of cryptography
Military communications
Kingdom of Travancore